Ifè (or Ifɛ) is a Niger–Congo language spoken by some 180,000 people in Togo, Benin and Ghana. It is also known as Ana, Ana-Ifé, Anago, Baate and Ede Ife. It has a lexical similarity of 87%–91% with Ede Nago.

Written works began to be produced in the language in the 1980s, published by the Comité Provisoire de Langue Ifɛ̀ and SIL. An Ifè–French dictionary (Oŋù-afɔ ŋa nfɛ̀ òŋu òkpi-ŋà ŋa nfãrãsé), edited by Mary Gardner and Elizabeth Graveling, was produced in 2000.

References

Yoruboid languages
Languages of Togo
Languages of Benin